Salem Post Office, also known as the Old Post Office, is a historic post office building located at Salem, Virginia.

History 
The Salem Post Office was built between 1922 and 1923. It is a one-story, Georgian Revival-style, brick building. It was designed by the Office of the Supervising Architect for the U.S. Treasury under the direction of Louis A. Simon. The main entrance features fluted Doric order pilasters surmounted by a Doric frieze with triglyphs and a dentilated pediment.  Additions were made to the rear of the building in the 1950s, 1960s, and 1989–1991.  The post office was decommissioned in 1985, and subsequently occupied by doctor's offices. In 2013, Roanoke College purchased the Old Post Office.

The building was added to the National Register of Historic Places in 1992. It is located in the Downtown Salem Historic District.

References

Post office buildings on the National Register of Historic Places in Virginia
Georgian Revival architecture in Virginia
Government buildings completed in 1923
Buildings and structures in Salem, Virginia
National Register of Historic Places in Salem, Virginia
Roanoke College
Individually listed contributing properties to historic districts on the National Register in Virginia